Willard A. Holland (1862–1930) played professional baseball for the 1889 Baltimore Orioles of the American Association. He played in the minor leagues through 1898. His son was 1949 Indianapolis 500 winner Bill Holland.

References 

Baltimore Orioles (AA) players
1862 births
1930 deaths
19th-century baseball players
Charleston Seagulls players
Salem Fairies players
Hazleton Pugilists players
Shenandoah Hungarian Rioters players
Dallas Hams players
Kansas City Blues (baseball) players
St. Paul Saints (AA) players
Mobile Blackbirds players
Montgomery Colts players
Toledo White Stockings players
Rockford Forest City players
Rockford Reds players
Terre Haute Hottentots players
Reading Actives players
Shamokin Coal Heavers players
Reading Coal Heavers players
Minor league baseball managers
Baseball players from Delaware
People from Georgetown, Delaware